KEEZ-FM  (99.1 MHz, "Mix 99.1") is an American radio station licensed to serve the community of Mankato, Minnesota and serving the Minnesota River Valley.  The station broadcasts a hot adult contemporary format. The station is owned by Alpha Media, through licensee Digity 3E License, LLC, along with sister stations KYSM-FM, KRBI-FM and KMKO-FM.

History
The station was granted license on May 15, 1968, as KEYC-FM. The station was started by Lee Enterprises, which also owned KEYC-TV. The station was sold in 1977 to Faribault County Broadcasting Co. for $200,000, principally owned by Paul C. Hedberg and his wife. Burke B. Bartell was General manager until 1980's. The station was a Top 40/CHR station by the mid-1980s and then shifted to a Hot AC format in the early 1990s. Hedberg Broadcasting sold the station in 1993 to Nolan Broadcast Group.

From January 1993 to the fall of 2000, KEEZ was owned and operated by Nolan Broadcast Group.  KEEZ was managed by Michael E. Nolan, who along with his father Philip E. Nolan owned KAUS-AM/KAUS-FM in Austin, Minnesota. In 2000, the station was sold to Three Eagles Communications.

KEEZ's longtime competitor, 96.7 KDOG was a CHR station from 1984 until shifting towards Hot AC in 2000. KDOG returned to their CHR roots as "Hot 96.7" on September 4, 2009.

While Z99 was a Hot AC format during the daytime (playing a mix of hit music from the 1980s, 1990s, 2000s and today), it took a Top 40/CHR format at night, as the station added hip-hop to their playlist, thus it could be considered an Adult Top 40. By 2012, Z99 was reborn as a full-fledged Top 40/CHR music station.

On October 31, 2018, at Midnight, KEEZ began stunting with a continuous loop of Michael Jackson's “Thriller” while branding as "Thriller 99.1". The next day, KEEZ relaunched with a hot adult contemporary format as "Mix 99.1".

Programming
Mix Mornings with TJ 6am-10am

On Air w/ Ryan Seacrest 10am-2pm

Jordan In The Afternoon 2pm-7pm

Nights with Kaden 7pm-Midnight

AT40 Sunday's 8am-Noon

XYZ Weekends with Erik Zachary Sat and Sun Noon-3pm

Weekends with Monroe Sat and Sun 3pm-7pm

Former Logos

References

External links
Mix 99.1 website

Radio stations in Minnesota
Mankato, Minnesota
Radio stations established in 1968
1968 establishments in Minnesota
Alpha Media radio stations
Hot adult contemporary radio stations in the United States